MLB at Field of Dreams is a recurring Major League Baseball (MLB) regular-season game played in a ballpark adjacent to Field of Dreams in Dyersville, Iowa, a site popularized by the 1989 baseball film Field of Dreams. The first edition of the game was played on August 12, 2021, with the Chicago White Sox defeating the New York Yankees, 9–8. The second edition of the game was played August 11, 2022, with the Chicago Cubs defeating the Cincinnati Reds, 4–2. Both games were held on the second Thursday of August.

Future games are on hold while a new youth baseball and softball complex is under construction at the Field of Dreams site.

Background

The first edition of the game was planned for August 13, 2020, with the Chicago White Sox facing the New York Yankees. However, due to the COVID-19 pandemic, MLB implemented a shortened 2020 season that limited games played to each team's division and the opposite league's geographically equal division to reduce travel. Hence, on July 1, MLB announced that the St. Louis Cardinals would replace the Yankees for the game. After several St. Louis players and coaches tested positive for COVID-19 in late July, MLB postponed several Cardinals games, eventually leading the league to announce on August 3 that the MLB at Field of Dreams game would be postponed to the 2021 season. In November 2020, MLB announced the 2021 game date and that the contest would feature the originally planned participants, the White Sox and Yankees.

Ballpark

The game is hosted in Dyersville, Iowa, near the filming location of the titular 1989 baseball movie. The new field is in the property of the Ameskamp family, who used to own the left and center field of the 1988 Field of Dreams (the rest was owned by the Lansing family) before selling it to the Lansing family in 2007.

The design of the ballpark pays homage to the White Sox' home from 1910 to 1990, Comiskey Park, including the shape of the outfield and the bullpens beyond the center field fence. Windows were included in the design of the right field wall to show the cornfields beyond the ballpark and to provide views of the movie set.

Following postponement of the originally scheduled game, the field remained fallow during the 2020 season. During the 2021 season, many of the temporary structures that were intended for MLB at Field of Dreams were moved to Sahlen Field in Buffalo, New York, to allow that Triple-A ballpark to accommodate the Toronto Blue Jays. In late June 2021, a news report by KTIV of Sioux City, Iowa, showed that the baseball field and lights were in place for MLB at Field of Dreams, but seating had not yet been erected.

Games

2021 game
On August 9, it was revealed that Iowa native Pat Hoberg would be the home plate umpire for the game. The White Sox and Yankees both wore throwback uniforms resembling those worn during the 1919 Major League Baseball season. Prior to the game, a pregame ceremony was conducted, during which Kevin Costner led players from both teams onto the field from the corn, in tribute to an iconic scene which occurs in the film while Maddie Poppe sang the national anthem. Bench coach Miguel Cairo managed the White Sox as manager Tony La Russa was unavailable due to a family funeral. This was the first MLB game played in the state of Iowa. The game was called by Joe Buck (play by play), John Smoltz (analyst), Ken Rosenthal (field reporter), and Tom Verducci (field reporter) on FOX.

Recap

The early game was defined by strikeouts, with four from Lance Lynn and three from Andrew Heaney through the first two innings. The first scoring was a home run over the left field fence by José Abreu in the bottom of the first inning, the first ever major league home run hit in the state of Iowa. From the third inning on, the game was described as a slugfest with home runs by Aaron Judge in the top of the third, Eloy Jiménez in the bottom of the third, Seby Zavala in the bottom of the fourth, and Brett Gardner in the top of the sixth. In the game, there was eight total home runs hit into the cornfield. Heading into the ninth inning, the White Sox led 7–4. The Yankees then rallied ahead with a pair of two-out, two-run home runs by Aaron Judge, his second of the night, and Giancarlo Stanton, both off of Liam Hendriks, to put them ahead of the White Sox by one run. After a ground out by pinch hitter Danny Mendick and a walk to Seby Zavala, the game ended with a walk-off two-run homer hit by Tim Anderson off of Zack Britton, giving the White Sox the 9–8 win. The homer was the 15th walk-off home run against the Yankees in White Sox history; the first was hit by Shoeless Joe Jackson on July 20, 1919, a fictional version of whom features heavily in the Field of Dreams film.

Line score

Reception
Fans and media personalities alike responded positively to the presentation of the game, which drew the highest ratings for a regular-season telecast on Fox Sports at 5.9 million viewers since a Yankees–Red Sox contest on October 1, 2005. Len Kasper, who called the game on radio for the White Sox, commented that "I’m not really sure MLB could have done an event better than the Field of Dreams Game. Yes, the game was bonkers and the finish was Oscar worthy, but the entire thing—the scenery, the park, the weather, the people involved, the vibe—it was just perfect. Unforgettable experience.”

2022 game
 
Shortly before the 2021 game, Commissioner of Baseball Rob Manfred confirmed that there would be another game at the Field of Dreams during 2022, likely during August, but did not identify which teams would be playing. MLB later announced that the Cincinnati Reds would play the Chicago Cubs at the site on August 11, 2022, with Cincinnati as the designated home team in the game. Retro-style uniforms for the teams were revealed on August 8, with the Reds' uniforms matching what the team wore in the 1919 World Series. Pre-game ceremonies began with Ken Griffey Sr. and Ken Griffey Jr. playing catch, followed by the Cubs and Reds walking in from the cornfield beyond centerfield along with multiple members of the National Baseball Hall of Fame—Johnny Bench, Andre Dawson, Ferguson Jenkins, Barry Larkin, Ryne Sandberg, and Billy Williams—and a ceremonial first pitch from Jenkins to Bench. The national anthem was sung by country singer Jessie James Decker. John Smoltz (analyst), Ken Rosenthal (field reporter), and Tom Verducci (field reporter) return to call the game with Joe Davis (play by play) calling now as the lead announcer for MLB on FOX.

Recap 
Drew Smyly recorded the pitching victory for the Cubs, lasting five innings with nine strikeouts and four hits allowed. The Reds only mustered two runs, in the bottom of the seventh inning, all while having two runners on base in three separate innings and with a total of eight runners left on base. Cincinnati second baseman Jonathan India left the contest after the third inning, due to a contusion on his left leg from being hit by a pitch in the first inning; his injury later required an emergency helicopter flight to an Iowa City hospital. Chicago catcher Willson Contreras rolled his ankle rounding second base in the third inning, but remained in the game.

Line score

MiLB at Field of Dreams
On April 21, 2022, Minor League Baseball (MiLB) announced the inaugural MiLB at Field of Dreams game, a High-A contest in Dyersville between teams of the Midwest League. On August 9, the Quad Cities River Bandits hosted and defeated the Cedar Rapids Kernels, 7–2. The teams used historical franchise names for the contest, Davenport Blue Sox and Cedar Rapids Bunnies, respectively.

Future
MLB will not host a game at the ballpark in 2023 due to construction around the site. Future plans include converting the site into a youth baseball and softball complex that one day would also have a hotel. Iowa Governor Kim Reynolds confirmed that there will be another round of public funding to build a permanent stadium at the site. Former MLB player Frank Thomas, who is part of the group that owns the property, did not rule out the possibility of future MLB games at the site after 2023.

Broadcasting
Since its inception, the game has been broadcast by Fox as part of their Thursday Night Baseball telecasts

See also
List of neutral site regular season Major League Baseball games played in the United States and Canada
NHL Winter Classic

References

Baseball in Iowa
Dyersville, Iowa
Recurring sporting events established in 2021
Annual events in Major League Baseball
Chicago Cubs
Chicago White Sox
Cincinnati Reds
New York Yankees